The String Quartet No. 14 in D minor, D 810, known as Death and the Maiden, is a piece by Franz Schubert that has been called "one of the pillars of the chamber music repertoire". It was composed in 1824, after the composer suffered a serious illness and realized that he was dying. It is named for the theme of the second movement, which Schubert took from a song he wrote in 1817 of the same title.

The quartet was first played in 1826 in a private home, and was not published until 1831, three years after Schubert's death.

Composition
1823 and 1824 were hard years for Schubert. For much of 1823 he was sick, some scholars believe with an outburst of tertiary stage syphilis, and in May had to be hospitalized. He was also without money: he had entered into a disastrous deal with Diabelli to publish a batch of works, and received almost no payment; and his latest attempt at opera,  Fierrabras, was a flop. In a letter to a friend, he wrote,

Yet, despite his bad health, poverty and depression, Schubert continued to turn out the tuneful, light and gemütlich music that made him the toast of Viennese society: the song cycle Die schöne Müllerin, the octet for string quartet, contrabass, clarinet, horn and bassoon, more than 20 songs, and numerous light pieces for piano.

After 1820, Schubert returned to the string quartet form, which he had last visited as a teenager. He wrote the one-movement Quartettsatz in 1820, and the Rosamunde quartet in 1824 using a theme from the incidental music that he wrote for a play that failed. These quartets are a huge step forward from his initial attempts. Even Schubert recognized this fact; in July 1824, he wrote to his brother Ferdinand of his earlier quartets, "it would be better if you stuck to other quartets than mine, for there is nothing in them..." There are several qualities that set these mature quartets apart from Schubert's earlier attempts. In the early quartets, it is primarily the first violin that carries the melody, with the other instruments playing supporting roles; in the later quartets, the part writing is much more advanced, and each instrument brings its own character and presence, for a more complex and integrated texture. Also, the later quartets are structurally much more integrated, with motifs, harmonies, and textures recurring in a way that ties the entire work together.

But beyond these technical improvements, Schubert in these later works made the quartet medium his own. "He had now ceased to write quartets to order, for experimental study, or for the home circle", writes Walter Willson Cobbett. "To the independent artist... the string quartet had now also become a vehicle for conveying to the world his inner struggles." For Schubert, who lived a life suspended between the lyrical, romantic, charming and the dramatic, chaotic, and depressive, the string quartet offered a medium "to reconcile his essentially lyric themes with his feeling for dramatic utterance within a form that provided the possibility of extreme color contrasts", writes music historian Homer Ulrich.

Schubert wrote the D minor quartet in March 1824, within weeks of completing the A minor Rosamunde quartet. He apparently planned to publish a three-set volume of quartets; but the Rosamunde was published within a year, while the D minor quartet was only published in 1831, three years after Schubert's death, by Diabelli. It was first played in January 1826 at the Vienna home of Karl and Franz Hacker, amateur violinists, apparently with Schubert on the viola.

Inspiration
The quartet takes its name from the lied "Der Tod und das Mädchen", D 531, a setting of the poem of the same name by Matthias Claudius that Schubert wrote in 1817. The theme of the song forms the basis of the second movement of the quartet. The theme is a death knell that accompanies the song about the terror and comfort of death.

The Maiden:
"Oh! leave me! Prithee, leave me! thou grisly man of bone!
For life is sweet, is pleasant.
Go! leave me now alone!
Go! leave me now alone!"

Death:
"Give me thy hand, oh! maiden fair to see,
For I'm a friend, hath ne'er distress'd thee.
Take courage now, and very soon
Within mine arms shalt softly rest thee!"

But it is not only this theme of the quartet that recalls death. The quote from the song "makes explicit the overriding theme of the work, its bleak vision and almost unremitting foreboding", writes Andrew Clements. From the violent opening unison. the first movement runs a relentless race through terror, pain and resignation, ending with a dying D minor chord. "The struggle with Death is the subject of the first movement, and the andante accordingly dwells on Death's words", writes Cobbett. After a scherzo movement, with a trio that provides the only lyrical respite from the depressing mood of the piece, the quartet ends with a tarantella – the traditional dance to ward off madness and death. "The finale is most definitely in the character of a dance of death; ghastly visions whirl past in the inexorable uniform rhythm of the tarantella", writes Cobbett.

So strong is the association of death with the quartet that some analysts consider it to be programmatic, rather than absolute music. "The first movement of Schubert's Death and the Maiden string quartet can be interpreted in a quasi-programmatic fashion, even though it is usually viewed as an abstract work", writes Deborah Kessler. Theologian Frank Ruppert sees the quartet as a musical expression of Judaeo-Christian religious myths. "This quartet, like so many of Schubert's works, is a kind of para-liturgy", he writes. Each movement is about a different episode in the mythic process of death and resurrection.

Analysis
The quartet throughout is characterized by sudden dramatic shifts from fortissimo to pianissimo, from the lyrical to the compelling and dramatic. A driving undercurrent of triplets is a recurring motif in all four movements.

There are four movements:
 Allegro, in D minor and common time
 Andante con moto, in G minor and cut time
 Scherzo: Allegro molto, in D minor and  time
 Presto, in D minor and  time

First movement: Allegro

Second movement: Andante con moto

Third movement: Scherzo Allegro molto

Cobbett describes the third movement as the "dance of the demon fiddler". There is indeed something demonic in this fast-paced scherzo, full of syncopations and, like the other movements, dramatic leaps from fortissimo to pianissimo.

The scherzo is designed as a classical minuet: two strains in  time, repeated, in D minor, followed by a contrasting trio section in D major, at a slower tempo, and ending with a recapitulation of the opening strains. The trio section is the only real respite from the compelling pace of the whole quartet: a typically Schubertesque melody, with the first violin playing a dancing descant above the melody line in the lower voices, then the viola takes the melody as the first violin plays high eighth notes.

The scherzo is a short movement, serving as an interlude leading to the frenetic last movement.

Fourth movement: Presto
The finale of the quartet is a tarantella in rondo-sonata form, in D minor. The tarantella is a breakneck Italian dance in 6/8 time, that, according to tradition, was a treatment for madness and convulsions brought on by the bite of a tarantula spider. Appropriately, Cobbett calls this movement "a dance of death".

The movement is built of sections. The first, main section recurs between each of the subsequent sections.

Reception

After the initial reading of the quartet in 1826, the quartet was played again at a house concert in the home of composer Franz Lachner, with violinist Ignaz Schuppanzigh leading. Schuppanzigh, one of the leading violinists of the time, who debuted many of Beethoven's and Schubert's quartets, was reportedly unimpressed. "Brother, this is nothing at all, let well alone: stick to your Lieder", the aging Schuppanzigh is reported to have said to Schubert.

Schuppanzigh's impressions notwithstanding, Schubert's quartet soon won a leading place on the concert stage and in the hearts of musicians. "Only the excellence of such a work as Schubert's D minor Quartet... can in any way console us for the early and grievous death of this first-born of Beethoven; in a few years he achieved and perfected things as no one before him", wrote Robert Schumann of the quartet.

In the testament of the work's popularity, it has been the most played string quartet in Carnegie Hall history with 56 performances.

The quartet has been honored by several transcriptions. In 1847, Robert Franz transcribed it for piano duet, and in 1896 Mahler planned an arrangement for string orchestra and notated the details in a score of the quartet (the work was never completed, however, and only the second movement was written out and played; modern revivals of the arrangement are by David Matthews and Kenneth Woods).

In the 20th century, British composer John Foulds and American composer Andy Stein made versions for full symphony orchestra.

At Fridtjof Nansen's state funeral in 1930, Death and the Maiden was performed instead of speeches.

The quartet has also inspired other works. Ariel Dorfman's 1991 play Death and the Maiden, adapted for film in 1994 by Roman Polanski, is about a woman tortured and raped in a South American dictatorship, to the strains of the quartet. It has also appeared as incidental music in numerous films: The Portrait of a Lady (Jane Campion, 1996), What? (Roman Polanski, 1972), Sherlock Holmes and the Case of the Silk Stocking (BBC production, 2004), and in Samuel Beckett's radio play All That Fall (1962).

References
Notes

Sources
 
 
 
 
 
 
 
 
 )
 
 
 Sierra Chamber Society Program Notes (2006)

Further reading

External links

 
 Death and the Maiden,  (baritone) and Boris Cepeda (piano)
, Christopher Hogwood, Gresham College
, Bruce Adolphe, Chamber music society of Lincoln Center
 "Death and the Maiden", BBC Radio 3 program (44 minutes)
 Recording performed by the Borromeo String Quartet from the Isabella Stewart Gardner Museum in MP3 format (Creative Commons 3.0 license).

String quartets by Franz Schubert
1824 compositions
Compositions in D minor
Compositions by Franz Schubert published posthumously
Death in music